Bray, occasionally Bray on Thames, is a suburban village and civil parish in the English county of Berkshire. It sits on the banks of the River Thames, to the southeast of Maidenhead of which it is a suburb. The village is mentioned in the comedic song "The Vicar of Bray". Bray contains two of the eight three-Michelin-starred restaurants in the United Kingdom and has several large business premises including Bray Studios at Water Oakley, where the first series of Hammer Horror films were produced.

Geography

It had a population of 8,425 at the 2001 census,<ref>[http://neighbourhood.statistics.gov.uk/dissemination/viewFullDataset.do?instanceSelection=03070&productId=779&$ph=60_61&datasetInstanceId=3070&startColumn=1&numberOfColumns=8&containerAreaId=790313 Office for National Statistics : Census 2001 : Parish Headcounts : Windsor and Maidenhead"]  Retrieved 3 November 2010</ref> increasing to 9,110 at the 2011 census. Bray is a large parish, although its area has shrunk considerably since Maidenhead was detached. As well as the village, the parish contains a large number of villages and hamlets, which were originally scattered amongst the remains of the dense woodland of Windsor Forest that once covered the area. These include: Braywick, Holyport, Water Oakley, Oakley Green, Moneyrow Green, Stud Green, Foxley Green, Touchen End, Braywoodside and Fifield.

Exclusive houses on the river between Bray and Maidenhead Bridge have been referred to as Berkshire's 'Millionaires' row' in the national press. The flood risk of these houses has been decreased by the Jubilee River, a large drainage ditch dug between north Maidenhead and Datchet. Monkey Island, in the Thames, is associated with the 3rd Duke of Marlborough, and houses two structures that he built and furnished with paintings of monkeys, and the Grade I listed building, Monkey Island Hotel. The ecclesiastical parish shares the wide parish boundaries and is named Bray St Michael with Braywoodside.

History
The first documented mention of Bray was as Brai in the Domesday Book of 1086.

Local government
Since the redistribution of parliamentary boundaries which took effect at the 2010 general election, Bray has been in Maidenhead, the constituency of former Prime Minister Theresa May. In terms of local government, it is in the Bray electoral ward of the Royal Borough of Windsor and Maidenhead.

Amenities
Restaurants
Bray contains two of the eight three-Michelin-starred restaurants in the United Kingdom: The Fat Duck is a restaurant run by chef Heston Blumenthal in the centre of Bray. The restaurant opened in 1995, and has held a three-star Michelin Guide rating since 2004. In 2005, it was named as the best restaurant in the world by Restaurant magazine and in 2008, 2009 and 2010, Best Restaurant in the UK, scoring a maximum 10 out of 10 in the Good Food Guide. The Waterside Inn was founded in 1972 by the brothers Michel and Albert Roux after their success with Le Gavroche. It is currently run by Michel's son, Alain and Frederic Poulette. The restaurant has three Michelin stars and in 2010 became the first restaurant outside France to retain all three stars for 25 years.

Transport
The B3028 road runs through the centre of Bray, and the A308 Maidenhead to Windsor road runs between Bray and the adjoining village of Holyport.

Notable buildings
Parish church

The Church of England parish church of St Michael was built in 1293, supposedly to replace a Saxon church at Water Oakley. It has a number of sculptures which may have come from the earlier church, including a damaged Sheela na Gig. It is best known to brass rubbers for housing the superb memorial brass of 1378 to Sir John Foxley, the Constable of Southampton Castle, and his two wives. One of the local cottages has a tunnel which it is believed leads to the church and served as an escape route for clergymen. The current Vicar of Bray is the Reverend Ainsley Swift.

Almshouses
The Jesus Hospital is a red-brick group of almhouses, founded in 1609 by William Goddard to house thirty-four of the aged poor of Bray and six of the Worshipful Company of Fishmongers, to which he belonged.  A full-size effigy of Goddard stands over the entrance. Jesus Hospital is now run by The Donnington Hospital Trust having been transferred from The Fishmongers Company in 2010.

Notable people
 Sylvia Anderson –  Co creator of the Thunderbirds Puppet Series and voice of Lady Penelope
 Ian Bairnson - Scottish musician 
 Heston Blumenthal (b. 1966) – The TV chef runs The Fat Duck and The Hinds Head Hotel restaurants in Bray
 Rolf Harris (b. 1930) – Australian artist, musician, TV presenter, convicted of sexual assault
 Carol Kirkwood - BBC Weather presenter lives here
 George Mountbatten, 2nd Marquess of Milford Haven (1892–1938) – buried in Bray Cemetery
 Sir Michael Parkinson (b. 1935) – journalist and TV presenter
 Tony Prince (b. 1944) – Disc Jockey
 Regenbald - Chancellor of King Edward the Confessor and King William the Conqueror was vicar of Bray

 Literature 

The village features as the home of the eponymous "The Vicar of Bray" in a satirical 18th-century song of that name. The titular character frequently changed his religious principles in order to remain in office throughout various reforming upheavals in the English church. The story was turned into an opera in 1882 and a film in 1937.

Edward Lear makes reference to Bray in More Nonsense Pictures, Rhymes, Botany, etc'':

Nearest places

References

External links

 
Villages in Berkshire
Populated places on the River Thames
Civil parishes in Berkshire
Royal Borough of Windsor and Maidenhead